is a railway station in Naka-ku, Hamamatsu,  Shizuoka Prefecture, Japan, operated by the private railway company, Enshū Railway.

Lines
Sukenobu Station is a station on the  Enshū Railway Line and is 2.4 kilometers from the starting point of the line at Shin-Hamamatsu Station.

Station layout
The station is an elevated station with dual opposed side platforms. It is staffed during daylight hours. The station building has automated ticket machines, and automated turnstiles which accept the NicePass smart card, as well as ET Card, a magnetic card ticketing system.

Platforms

Adjacent stations

|-
!colspan=5|Enshū Railway

Station history

Sukenobu Station was established on December 6, 1909. The station building was rebuilt in 1953. All freight operations ceased in 1974. The tracks were elevated, changing from an island platform to an opposed side platform layout,  and a new station building was completed in 1985.

Passenger statistics
In fiscal 2017, the station was used by an average of 1,324  passengers daily (boarding passengers only).

Surrounding area
The station is located in a residential area.

See also
 List of railway stations in Japan

References

External links

 Enshū Railway official website

Railway stations in Japan opened in 1909
Railway stations in Shizuoka Prefecture
Railway stations in Hamamatsu
Stations of Enshū Railway